Last Order or Last Orders may refer to:

 Last order, used in the UK instead of Last call (bar term), an announcement made in a pub or bar before serving drinks is stopped
 Battle Angel Alita: Last Order, the follow-up series to the Battle Angel Alita manga
 Last Order: Final Fantasy VII, a 2005 animated feature based on the video game Final Fantasy VII
 Last Order, a character in the A Certain Magical Index series
 Last Orders, a 1996 Booker Prize-winning novel by Graham Swift
 Last Orders (film), a 2001 film based on Swift's novel
 Last Orders (band), an English folk band founded in 2006
 Last Orders (album), the 2007 debut album by the band

See also

60ml: Last Order, 2014 Indian film about alcoholism
Final Order (disambiguation)
Last (disambiguation)
Order (disambiguation)